Nirjhar Pratapgarhi is an Indian poet of Awadhi as well Hindi language and archaeologist from Pratapgarh, Uttar Pradesh, India. His real name is Rajesh Pandey. He is the founder of India's first village museum called Ajgra Sangrahalay in Raniganj tehsil, Pratapgarh.

References 

1960 births
Living people
Hindi-language poets
Indian male poets
People from Pratapgarh, Uttar Pradesh
20th-century Indian archaeologists
Poets from Uttar Pradesh